Tapirus greslebini is an extinct species of tapir that lived in South America during the Pleistocene.

It was originally described by Carlos Rusconi in 1934, from remains collected in the Puelchense sands of Villa Ballester in Buenos Aires, Argentina.

T. greslebini is one of seven Pleistocene South American tapirs to be considered valid.

References

Prehistoric tapirs
Pleistocene mammals of South America
Pleistocene odd-toed ungulates